Leon Joseph Hart (November 2, 1928 – September 24, 2002) was an American football end. He won the Heisman Trophy and the Maxwell Award while at the University of Notre Dame in 1949 and played in the National Football League (NFL) for eight seasons, from 1950 to 1957, with the Detroit Lions.

Hart is the only lineman to win three college football national championships and three NFL Championships. He is the most recent of only two lineman ever to win the Heisman Trophy. Also, he is one of four players, along with Angelo Bertelli, Cam Newton, and Joe Burrow to win the Heisman Trophy, a national championship, and be the first overall pick in the NFL Draft all in the same one-year span.

Early years
Hart was born in Pittsburgh in 1928 raised in nearby Turtle Creek, Pennsylvania, and attended Turtle Creek High School. He won varsity letters in football, basketball and baseball while in high school.

Notre Dame
Hart attended the University of Notre Dame where he played college football at the end position, both offense and defense, for Frank Leahy's Fighting Irish football teams from 1946 to 1949. He received first-team All-American honors three times, from the Football Writers Association of America (FWAA) in 1947 and as a consensus first-team selection in 1948 and 1949. During his four years at Notre Dame, Hart caught 49 passes for 701 yards and 15 touchdowns, at that time a collegiate record. The Fighting Irish compiled a 46–0–2 record and won three national championships while Hart was a player.

Hart began playing for Notre Dame as a 17-year-old freshman in 1946.

Hart was the captain of the 1949 Notre Dame team that compiled a perfect 10–0 record, outscored their opponents 360–86, and was recognized in the final AP Poll as the 1949 national champion. At the end of the 1949 season, Hart won both the Heisman Trophy and the Maxwell Award. He was also voted as the Associated Press Athlete of the Year award with 104 points, edging professional baseball player Jackie Robinson (55 points).

Hart graduated from Notre Dame in 1950 with a degree in mechanical engineering.

Detroit Lions
Hart was selected by the Detroit Lions with the first overall pick in the 1950 NFL Draft. He signed a three-year contract with the Lions in February 1950 for a salary reported to be close to $20,000. He played for the Lions from 1950 to 1957, appeared in 92 games, and was a member of NFL championship teams in 1952, 1953, and 1957. During his eight-year NFL career, Hart gained 3,111 yards from scrimmage, caught 174 passes for 2,499 yards, and scored 32 touchdowns and 192 points.

Family and later years
In February 1950, Hart married Lois Newyahr, his high school girlfriend, at St. Colman's Roman Catholic Church in Turtle Creek. After retiring from football, he lived in Birmingham, Michigan. He operated a business that manufactured equipment to balance tires.

Hart was inducted into the College Football Hall of Fame in 1973. He died in 2002 at St. Joseph Medical Center in South Bend, Indiana, at age 73. He was buried in the Cedar Grove Cemetery in Notre Dame, Indiana.

References

External links
 
 
 
 

1928 births
2002 deaths
All-American college football players
American football ends
American people of Polish descent
College Football Hall of Fame inductees
Detroit Lions players
Heisman Trophy winners
Maxwell Award winners
National Football League first-overall draft picks
Notre Dame Fighting Irish football players
Players of American football from Pittsburgh
Western Conference Pro Bowl players